The Greatest is a television series broadcast on VH1. Each episode counts down either songs, albums, music videos, moments, musicians, or celebrities of a particular category.

Episodes

References

100 Greatest Women of Rock & Roll review

External links
VH1 - The Greatest: Main Page 
VH1 - The Greatest: All Episodes 

VH1 original programming